Eleonora Dziękiewicz (née Staniszewska) (born 25 October 1978) is a Polish volleyball player, a member of Poland women's national volleyball team and Polish club Tauron MKS Dąbrowa Górnicza, bronze medalist of European Championship 2009, three-time Polish Champion (2007, 2010, 2012).

Career

Clubs
  Gedania Gdańsk
  Sokół Mogilno
  Gedania Gdańsk
  KPSK Stal Mielec (2000–2003)
  Nafta-Gaz Piła (2003–2006)
  Winiary Kalisz (2006–2008)
  BKS Stal Bielsko-Biała (2008–2010)
  Atom Trefl Sopot (2010–2012)
  Muszynianka Muszyna (2012–2013)
  MKS Dąbrowa Górnicza (2013–present)

National team
In October 2009 she won with teammates bronze medal of European Championship 2009 after winning match against Germany.

Sporting achievements

Clubs

CEV Cup
  2008/2009 - with BKS Stal Bielsko-Biała

National championships
 2004/2005  Polish Championship, with Nafta-Gaz Piła
 2005/2006  Polish Championship, with Nafta-Gaz Piła
 2006/2007  Polish Cup, with Winiary Kalisz
 2006/2007  Polish Championship, with Winiary Kalisz
 2007/2008  Polish Championship, with Winiary Kalisz
 2008/2009  Polish Cup, with BKS Stal Bielsko-Biała
 2008/2009  Polish Championship, with BKS Stal Bielsko-Biała
 2009/2010  Polish Championship, with BKS Stal Bielsko-Biała
 2010/2011  Polish Championship, with Atom Trefl Sopot
 2011/2012  Polish Championship, with Atom Trefl Sopot
 2012/2013  Polish Championship, with Muszynianka Muszyna
 2012/2013  Polish SuperCup, with Muszynianka Muszyna

National team

CEV European Championships
  2009 Poland

Individually
 2007 Polish Cup - Most Valuable Player
 2007 FIVB World Grand Prix - Best Blocker

References

External links
 Profile at FIVB
 Profile at CEV
 Player profile  at Orlen Liga

1978 births
Living people
Sportspeople from Gdańsk
Sportspeople from Pomeranian Voivodeship
Polish women's volleyball players